Alfréd Justitz (19 July 1879 in Nová Cerekev – 9 February 1934 in Bratislava) was a Czech Modernist painter and illustrator.

Biography 
He was one of three sons born into a Jewish family; their father was a doctor and their mother a homemaker. His first contact with art came in Jihlava, where he met the aspiring painter, Roman Havelka, who was two years his senior.

As a result, Justitz decided to pursue a creative career and began by studying architecture at the Czech Technical University in Prague with Professor Jan Kotěra. He transferred to the Academy of Fine Arts, where he studied with Maximilian Pirner and Franz Thiele. After that, he worked with Ludwig Schmid-Reutte in Karlsruhe and Wilhelm Trübner in Berlin.

In 1910, he visited Paris, where he was influenced by the works of Paul Cézanne and Honoré Daumier. From 1918 to 1924, he exhibited with "Tvrdošíjní", a group of mostly young, modern artists. Later, he would create posters for galleries and stores. In 1927, he produced illustrations for the Czech edition of Notre Dame de Paris by Victor Hugo. The following year, he joined the Mánes Union of Fine Arts.

In addition to painting, Justitz loved dogs and was an enthusiastic promoter and breeder of boxers. He became a  trustee of the "ČeskoMoravská Kynologická Unie" (a kennel club), where he was put in charge of maintaining the breeding records. He was also an active Freemason of the lodge "Sibi et Posteris" in Prague. 

He died at a hospital in Bratislava, after a long illness. His ashes were returned to his hometown and placed in an urn at the Jewish cemetery. The Masonic Lodge provided support for his widow Anna, but she never recovered from his death. She committed suicide by poisoning not long after the German Occupation in 1939, when the threat of the Nazis to Jews was obvious.

Selected paintings

References

Further reading 
 Marie Dohnalová, Alfred Justitz: Obrazy, kresby a grafiky (exhibition catalog), Moravian Gallery in Brno, 1989
 Václav Zykmund, Alfred Justitz, (Volume 47 of Nové prameny) Nakl. ceskoslovenskych vytvarnych umelcu, 1962

External links 

 ArtNet: More paintings by Justitz

1879 births
1934 deaths
People from Nová Cerekev
People from the Kingdom of Bohemia
Czech Jews
Jewish painters
Cubist artists
Czech illustrators
Dog breeders
20th-century Czech painters
Czech male painters
20th-century Czech male artists